Hubert van Es (6 July 1941 – 15 May 2009) was a Dutch photographer and photojournalist who took the well-known photo on 29 April 1975, which shows South Vietnamese civilians scrambling to board a CIA Air America helicopter during the U.S. evacuation of Saigon. The picture was taken a day before the Fall of Saigon.

Van Es was variously known in his working life as "Hu", the anglicized "Hugh" and the nickname "Vanes", to rhyme with "planes".

Early life
Hubert van Es was born in Hilversum, the Netherlands. He moved to Hong Kong in 1967, where he initially worked as a freelancer, before joining the South China Morning Post as chief photographer.

Career in Vietnam

Hubert van Es went to Vietnam in 1968, where he worked for NBC News as a sound man. He later joined the Associated Press photo staff in Saigon from 1969 to 1972 and then covered the last three years of the Vietnam War, from 1972 to 1975, for United Press International (UPI). In 1975 he was working in Saigon for UPI. He remained in the city for as long as possible before its occupation by North Vietnamese troops. On 29 April 1975 he had taken pictures of Saigonese burning documents that could associate them with the United States as well as a picture of a Marine confronting a Vietnamese mother and her little boy. Later that day, he took his famous picture:

When North Vietnamese troops arrived, Van Es wore a camouflage hat bearing a small plastic Dutch flag printed with the Vietnamese words Báo chí Hà Lan ("Dutch Press").

The building in the photo, which has been incorrectly identified as the US Embassy, Saigon since the 1970s, was not labeled as such by Van Es. He has stated that he wrote, for the caption of his photograph, that the helicopter was taking evacuees off the roof of a CIA building in downtown Saigon (22 Gia Long Street). At United Press International's (UPI) Tokyo office, someone changed the caption to include the false reference to the "U.S. embassy." Although van Es attempted to have the caption corrected, his efforts proved futile and he eventually gave up. The iconic location's current address is 22 Lý Tự Trọng Street (named after Lý Tự Trọng, a 17-year-old communist executed by the French) and visitors are allowed access to the roof by taking the elevator to the 9th floor.

Later career
Van Es covered the Insurgency in the Philippines and the Soviet invasion of Afghanistan. He attempted to return to Vietnam but was not able to do so until 1990. Upon his return to Vietnam, while visiting the countryside, he was quoted as remarking: "It [Vietnam] hasn't really changed since I was last here; but our photos changed the views of those who were lucky enough not to witness this terrible war."

Death
On 15 May 2009, Van Es died in Queen Mary Hospital, Hong Kong, at the age of 67 from a haemorrhagic stroke. He had lived in Hong Kong since the end of the Vietnam War.

References

External links
 Hugh Van Es dies at 67; Dutch photojournalist took famous Saigon evacuation photo Los Angeles Times, May 15, 2009
 Bangkok 2002 Reunion Photo Gallery (Van Es is pictured)
 "Thirty Years at 300 Millimeters" (Written by Van Es) NY Times Published: April 29, 2005
 Vietnam War photographer Van Es dies UPI May 15, 2009 at 9:20 AM
 

1941 births
2009 deaths
1975 in Vietnam
People from Hilversum
People of the Vietnam War
Photography in Vietnam
War photographers
Dutch photojournalists